Charles James Adams (born 16 May 1994) is an English professional footballer who plays for San Diego Loyal as a midfielder. He is a product of the Brentford youth system and has played in England, the United States and Austria.

Career

Brentford
During the 2010 off-season, Adams signed a two-year scholarship at League One club Brentford. Initially a left back, he had earlier joined the club's Centre of Excellence after being spotted by the Community Sports Trust and then progressing through the futsal scheme and the Advance Training Programme. Adams was an unused substitute during the first team's final match of the 2010–11 season, a 4–4 draw at Huddersfield Town. During the 2011–12 season, Adams made 22 appearances for the youth team in the Youth Alliance South East Conference and was a star in Brentford's run in the FA Youth Cup. He scored in a 2–1 victory over Hull City in the third round and was man of the match in a 2–1 defeat away to Stoke City in the fourth round, before injuries cut short his season.

Adams signed a one-year development squad contract in April 2012. Having completed his development from left back to left winger or attacking midfielder, he made his first team debut in a 2–0 league defeat away to Carlisle United on 9 March 2013, coming on as a 75th-minute substitute for Adam Forshaw, which proved to be his only appearance of the season. During the 2012–13 season, Adams made 22 development squad appearances and scored seven goals.

In June 2013, Adams signed a new two-year contract to remain part of the development squad. On 11 February 2014, Adams joined Conference Premier club Barnet on loan until the end of the 2013–14 season. He made five appearances during his spell, before being recalled by Brentford on 9 March. 11 days later, Adams was promoted into the first team squad and finished the 2013–14 season with three appearances.

Well down the pecking order following Brentford's promotion to the Championship, Adams was called into the first team squad on just one occasion during the first two months of the 2014–15 season. On 17 October 2014, Adams and Brentford teammate Josh Clarke joined League Two club Stevenage on one-month youth loans. After six appearances, the club took up the option of extending Adams' loan for another month. He made 11 appearances for Stevenage and returned to Griffin Park when his loan expired. He won no further first team call-ups before departing Brentford in late February 2015. Adams made just four senior appearances for Brentford, all as a substitute.

Louisville City
On 27 February 2015, Adams transferred to United Soccer League club Louisville City, after impressing manager James O'Connor while on loan at Stevenage. He made 21 appearances and scored three goals during a successful 2015 season, which saw City reach the Eastern Conference Finals. Despite being one year into a two-year contract, injury problems led to Adams' release at the end of the 2015 season.

Return to Stevenage 
Adams rejoined Stevenage on a short-term contract on 25 March 2016. He made two appearances and was released at the end of the season.

Real Monarchs 
On 3 August 2016, Adams returned to the United Soccer League to join Real Monarchs. In what remained of the 2016 season, he scored one goal in five appearances and followed up in 2017 with 25 appearances and one goal. Adams improved his tally to 32 appearances and six goals during the 2018 season, but for the second season running, the Monarchs' campaign ended with defeat in the first round of the Western Conference play-off quarter-finals. He was released at the end of the 2018 season, after making 62 appearances and scoring eight goals for the club.

Orange County SC 
On 19 December 2018, Adams signed a contract with USL Championship club Orange County SC. He made 11 appearances before his contract was terminated by mutual consent in June 2019.

FC Pinzgau Saalfelden 
In July 2019, Adams signed a three-year contract with Austrian Regionalliga Salzburg club Pinzgau Saalfelden on a free transfer. He made 17 appearances and scored three goals before cost-cutting measures led to his contract being cancelled during the 2019–20 winter break.

San Diego Loyal 
On 5 February 2019, Adams returned to the United States to join USL Championship expansion team San Diego Loyal. He made 16 appearances and scored one goal during the 2020 season. Adams was retained for 2021 and made 33 appearances, scoring one goal, during a season which ended with defeat in the 2021 USL Championship playoff quarter-finals. By the end of the season, he had been named captain and was retained for 2022. Adams made 28 appearances and scored five goals during a 2022 season which again ended with defeat in the USL Championship playoff quarter-finals. He was retained for the 2023 season.

Personal life 
Adams' father is a retired professional footballer and his brother is a semi-professional footballer.

Career statistics

Honours 
Real Monarchs

 United Soccer League regular season: 2017
 United Soccer League Western Conference regular season: 2017

References

External links

Charlie Adams at sdloyal.com

1994 births
Living people
English footballers
Association football midfielders
Brentford F.C. players
Barnet F.C. players
Stevenage F.C. players
English Football League players
National League (English football) players
Louisville City FC players
USL Championship players
English expatriate footballers
Expatriate soccer players in the United States
English expatriate sportspeople in the United States
Real Monarchs players
Orange County SC players
English expatriate sportspeople in Austria
English expatriates in Austria
Expatriate footballers in Austria
Austrian Regionalliga players
San Diego Loyal SC players